The United Kingdom of Great Britain and Northern Ireland competed as Great Britain at the 1972 Winter Olympics in Sapporo, Japan.

Alpine skiing

Men

Men's slalom

Women

Biathlon

Men

 1 One minute added per close miss (a hit in the outer ring), two minutes added per complete miss.

Men's 4 x 7.5 km relay

 2 A penalty loop of 200 metres had to be skied per missed target.

Bobsleigh

Cross-country skiing

Men

Women

Figure skating

Men

Women

Pairs

Luge

Men

(Men's) Doubles

Speed skating

Men

References
Official Olympic Reports
International Olympic Committee results database
 Olympic Winter Games 1972, full results by sports-reference.com

Nations at the 1972 Winter Olympics
1972 Winter Olympics
Winter Olympics
Winter sports in the United Kingdom